Rui Machado was the defending champion, but chose to compete in Rome instead.
Lu Yen-hsun won in the final 3–6, 7–6(7–4), 6–4, against Rainer Schüttler.

Seeds

Draw

Finals

Top half

Bottom half

References
Main Draw
Qualifying Singles

Status Athens Open - Singles
2010 Singles